Adult Contemporary is a chart published by Billboard ranking the top-performing songs in the United States in the adult contemporary music (AC) market.  In 1969, 17 songs topped the chart, then published under the title Easy Listening, based on playlists submitted by easy listening radio stations and sales reports submitted by stores.

On the first chart of 1969, Glen Campbell held the top spot with "Wichita Lineman", which was in its fourth week at number one, and remained atop the chart for a further two weeks.  Campbell would go on to top the chart with "Galveston" and "Try a Little Kindness", making him the only act to achieve three Easy Listening number ones in 1969.  His total of ten weeks in the top spot was also the highest achieved by any act during the year.  The only other act with multiple chart-toppers during the year was The 5th Dimension, who reached the top spot with "Medley: Aquarius/Let the Sunshine In (The Flesh Failures)" and "Wedding Bell Blues".  The longest unbroken run at number one by a song was eight weeks, achieved by orchestra leader Henry Mancini's "Love Theme from Romeo and Juliet".

Several of 1969's chart-toppers came from films and stage musicals.  These included Mancini's theme from the film Romeo and Juliet, Oliver's song "Jean" from the film The Prime of Miss Jean Brodie, The 5th Dimension's medley of two songs from the musical Hair, and Sammy Davis Jr.'s version of "I've Gotta Be Me", which was a major hit despite the musical in which it originated, Golden Rainbow, being unsuccessful. There was considerable crossover in 1969 between the Easy Listening chart and Billboards all-genres chart, the Hot 100.  Five songs topped both charts during the year: Mancini's "Love Theme from Romeo and Juliet" and both of The 5th Dimension's chart-toppers, as well as "In the Year 2525 (Exordium and Terminus)" by Zager and Evans and "Leaving on a Jet Plane" by Peter, Paul and Mary.  Additionally, the final Easy Listening number one of the year, "Raindrops Keep Fallin' on My Head" by B. J. Thomas, went on to top the Hot 100 early in 1970.  Although Zager and Evans achieved the feat of topping both listings, the duo proved to be a one-hit wonder and never placed another song on any of Billboards charts.

Chart history

References

See also
1969 in music
List of artists who reached number one on the U.S. Adult Contemporary chart

1969
1969 record charts